The σ-algebra of τ-past, (also named stopped σ-algebra, stopped σ-field, or σ-field of τ-past) is a σ-algebra associated with a stopping time in the theory of stochastic processes, a branch of probability theory.

Definition 
Let  be a stopping time on the filtered probability space . Then the σ-algebra

is called the σ-algebra of τ-past.

Properties

Monotonicity 
Is  are two stopping times and

almost surely, then

Measurability 
A stopping time  is always -measurable.

Intuition 

The same way  is all the information up to time ,  is all the information up time . The only difference is that  is random. For example, if you had a random walk, and you wanted to ask, “How many times did the random walk hit −5 before it first hit 10?”, then letting  be the first time the random walk hit 10,  would give you the information to answer that question.

References 

Stochastic processes
Families of sets